Christ Church Cathedral, built in 1916 to replace the earlier 1874 building, is the Episcopal  cathedral in Eau Claire, Wisconsin.  It is the mother church for the Episcopal Diocese of Eau Claire, the see of which is located in Eau Claire. The cathedral and parish house were added to the National Register of Historic Places in 1982.

The chancel and the parish house were designed by Minnesota architects Purcell, Feick and Elmslie in 1909.  The nave of the church was designed by Purcell and Elmslie six years later.  Their designs reflect their "use of English antecedents."

The cathedral has stained glass windows that a church pamphlet describes as 'among some of the finest in the country in richness and ecclesiastical style'.  Six windows were designed by Heaton, Butler, and Bayne of London;  others were supplied by Wippell Company of Exeter, England.

The parish house is a two-and-a-half-story stone and stucco building.

Also designed by Purcell and Elmslie is the Community House, First Congregational Church, also in Eau Claire, also listed on the National Register (in 1974).

See also

List of the Episcopal cathedrals of the United States
List of cathedrals in the United States

References

External links

 Christ Church Cathedral, Eau Claire, Wisconsin Website
Episcopal Diocese of Eau Claire

Episcopal churches in Wisconsin
Christ Church Eau Claire
Churches in Eau Claire, Wisconsin
Churches on the National Register of Historic Places in Wisconsin
Churches completed in 1916
20th-century Episcopal church buildings
National Register of Historic Places in Eau Claire County, Wisconsin